Dog Almighty is a Norwegian rock band consisting of Fridtjof Nilsen, Kim Nordbæk and Fredrik Wallumrød, started in January 2006. It was formed from the bands Span and Farout Fishing.

Discography
2007 Dog Almighty (album) 

Norwegian rock music groups
Musical groups established in 2006
2006 establishments in Norway

Musical groups from Norway with local place of origin missing